Jonathan Katz is an American actor.

Jonathan Katz may also refer to:

Jonathan Katz (computer scientist)
Jonathan David Katz (born 1958), professor of queer studies
Jonathan Ned Katz (born 1938), historian of human sexuality
Jon Katz (born 1947), technology writer
Jonathan M. Katz (born 1980), foreign correspondent and author
Jonathan Katz, CEO of Katz Broadcasting, now a subsidiary of the E. W. Scripps Company